Robert Mensah Abbey was a Ghanaian boxer and politician. Before politics, Abbey was a professional boxer and later clerk who worked in Accra. Abbey was nominated by the Convention People's Party to contest for the Accra West seat in the 1956 Gold Coast legislative election in place of Thomas Hutton-Mills who had been appointed deputy commissioner of the Gold Coast. He won the seat and served as a member of parliament for Accra West from 1956 to 1965. In 1965 he became the member of parliament representing the Okaikwei electoral district. Abbey was the father of J. L. S. Abbey the former Ghanaian public servant and ambassador.

See also
 List of MLAs elected in the 1956 Gold Coast legislative election
 List of MPs elected in the 1965 Ghanaian parliamentary election

References

Year of birth missing
Year of death missing
Ghanaian MPs 1956–1965
Ghanaian MPs 1965–1966
Convention People's Party (Ghana) politicians